Un chant d'amour (English: A Song of Love) is French writer Jean Genet's only film, which he directed in 1950. Because of its explicit (though artistically presented) homosexual content, the 26-minute movie was long banned.

Plot 

The film begins with a hand extended from prison bars, swinging a bouquet of flowers towards, but never reaching another hand extended from adjacent prison bars. The plot is set in a French prison, where a prison guard takes voyeuristic pleasure in observing the prisoners perform masturbatory sexual acts. In two adjacent cells, there is an older Algerian-looking man and a tattooed convict in his twenties. The older man is in love with the younger one, rubbing himself against the wall and sharing his cigarette smoke with his beloved through a straw.

The prison guard, apparently jealous of the prisoners' relationship, enters the older convict's cell and beats him. Following this, the inmate drifts off into a fantasy where he and his object of desire roam the countryside. In the final scene, it becomes clear that the guard's power is no match for the intensity of attraction between the prisoners, even though their relationship is not consummated. The prison guard makes the older prisoner suck on his gun in a sexual fashion. The guard therefore becomes a distorted reflection of the prisoners' love for each other. The film ends with the other hand grasping the flowers and taking the flowers behind his own bars.

Genet does not use dialogue in his film, but focuses instead on close-ups of bodies, on faces, armpits and penises. The film is also rich in symbolism, and the entire narrative may be read as symbolic of the desire for consummation of love between two persons, realised in part through the voyeuristic and sadistic intervention of a third.

Production 
Un chant d'amour was French writer Jean Genet's only film, which he directed. Jean Cocteau was believed to be the film's cinematographer.

Controversy and ban

Critical reception 
Un chant d'amour was described in The Queer Encyclopedia of Film & Television as "one of the earliest and most remarkable attempts to portray homosexual passion on-screen". Fernando F. Croce of Slant wrote "A revolutionary vision of emancipation through sensuality, Un chant d'amour is a song of love both universal and eternal." Jamie Rich of DVD Talk called it "an effective film, albeit a tad clumsy and pretentious" that is "still a progressive and interesting experiment worth the time one is willing to put into it." Phil Hall of Film Threat was more critical, writing "working in a silent film medium robs Genet of the lyrical language that dominated his artistic genius, and instead he presents a skein of imagery that becomes sillier and sillier as the film progresses. [...] Strictly of curio value, "Un chant d'amour" can offer contemporary viewers little more than some unintentional gay giggles."

On Rotten Tomatoes the film has an approval rating of 100% based on reviews from 8 critics.

Legacy 
The film has been cited as an influence for many gay filmmakers, including Derek Jarman, Andy Warhol, and Paul Morrissey.

Cast 
 Bravo	as older prisoner (uncredited)
 Lucien Sénémaud as younger prisoner (uncredited)
 Java as nude prisoner (uncredited)
 André Reybaz as Guard (uncredited)
 Coco Le Martiniquais as second dancing prisoner (uncredited)

See also 
 List of avant-garde films of the 1950s

References

Further reading

External links 
 

1950 films
1950s LGBT-related films
French LGBT-related films
French short films
Works by Jean Genet
Censored films
LGBT-related controversies in film
Obscenity controversies in film
LGBT-related short films
LGBT-related coming-of-age films
1950s French films